Feltonfleet School is a preparatory school for boys and girls from 3 to 13 years old, based in Cobham, Surrey in a Grade II listed building. The school is a charitable trust. It was founded in 1903 and started accepting girls in 1994.

During World War II the school was evacuated to North Perrott Manor House.

References

Preparatory schools in Surrey
1903 establishments in England
Educational institutions established in 1903